Harley Fenwick Payne (January 8, 1868 – December 29, 1935), was a professional baseball player who played pitcher for the Brooklyn Bridegrooms and Pittsburgh Pirates from 1896 to 1899.

External links

1868 births
1935 deaths
Major League Baseball pitchers
Baseball players from Ohio
Brooklyn Bridegrooms players
Pittsburgh Pirates players
People from Ashtabula County, Ohio
Youngstown Giants players
Peoria Distillers players
Kansas City Blues (baseball) players
Kansas City Cowboys (minor league) players
Marinette Badgers players
Albany Senators players
Allentown Buffaloes players
Syracuse Stars (minor league baseball) players
Rochester Browns players
Toronto Canucks players